Elyes is a given name. It is the given name of the following people:
Elyes Gabel (born 1983), English actor
Elyes Fakhfakh, Tunisian politician
Elyes Karamosli (born 1989 in Hammam-Lif, Tunisia), Tunisian volleyball player
Elyes Garfi (born 1993), Tunisian volleyball player

Tunisian masculine given names